WRFB (channel 5), branded on-air as ABC Puerto Rico, is a television station licensed to Carolina, serving the San Juan area as an affiliate of ABC. It is a full-time satellite of Mayagüez-licensed WORA-TV (channel 5) which is owned by Telecinco, Inc. WRFB's transmitter is located on Cerro Marquesa in Aguas Buenas; its parent station maintains studios on Ponce de León Avenue in Santurce, with additional studios at the Guanajibo Building in Mayagüez.

Sale to Telecinco

On June 15, 2017, WRFB sold for over $600,000 to Telecinco, Inc. through subsidiary ERA International Corporation, and after the transaction with a $30,000 deposit had been made by the buyer, this became a sister station of WORA-TV in Mayagüez. WRFB was to be used to bring ABC network programming as a satellite of WORA-DT2, and TVE programming from VIVE/WORA-DT3, expanding the coverage area. The sale of WRFB to Telecinco was completed on October 22, 2017.

Due to the passage of Hurricane Maria, WRFB went off the air on September 20. WRFB returned to the air for a brief period of testing, then went silent once again on August 19, 2018. After months off the air, the station returned to the air on February 22, 2019 as a repeater for WORA-TV and switched its virtual channel position from channel 51 to channel 5.

Owners 

 1997–2001: Rickyn Sanchez (VTK PR, Inc.) 
 1998–2001: ZDE-TV Broadcasting, Inc.
 1999–2002: Pegasus Communications (WZDE Licensee, Inc.)
 2001–2017: R&F Broadcasting
 July–October 2013: Destino Media Group (Destino Network)
 2017–2018: ERA International Corporation
 2018–present: Telecinco, Inc.

Branding 

 1997–1999: MusicaVisión
 2000–2001: VTK
 2001–2003: WRFB-TV Canal 52
 2003–2013: Videomax
 2013: My Destino TV
 2013–2014: Telemicro Internacional
 2014–2016: Videomax Canal 51
 2016–2017: SuperCanal
 2017–2019: Telecinco / WORA Televisión
 2019-2020: ABC 5 Puerto Rico
 2020–present: ABC Puerto Rico

Digital television 
The station's digital signal is multiplexed:

On June 12, 2009, WRFB signed off its analog signal and completed its move to digital.

References

External links 

ABC network affiliates
Television channels and stations established in 1997
1997 establishments in Puerto Rico
RFB
Carolina, Puerto Rico